Free-Form Select (with synonyms) is a technique in printmaking, graphic design and image processing.

The effect is to erase background colors or elements from a motif to create stand-alone objects. Today, this is done with graphics software (computer graphics) and computers rather than by cutting away parts with scissors or scalpels.

Almost every modern graphics software includes this feature, such as CorelDRAW, Adobe Photoshop, GIMP, and Microsoft Paint. The motif which is to be cut-out freehanded is defined by a border path around the motif.

Free-Form Select is also understood in coloring parts of a black-and-white images and vice versa. Coloring a single object within a black-and-white environment is sometimes called Sin City effect.

See also
Chroma key
Computer-aided design
Cropping (image)
Vignetting (scene setting in photography)

References and footnotes 

Imaging
Printmaking
Publishing
Photographic techniques
Composition in visual art